The Golfers Land is a site on the Royal Mile in Edinburgh, Scotland dating to around 1681. The site gets its name from the town house of John Paterson, said have been the teammate of the Duke of Albany in what is often regarded as the first international golf contest. The townhouse has since been demolished and replaced with a new building, but a plaque on the wall continues to mark the site of Golfers Land.

The First International Golf Contest
The contest is alleged to have arisen in 1681 when two of the Duke of Albany's English guests at Holyrood Palace claimed that the game of golf belonged to the English, not the Scottish. It is claimed that the two English nobles boasted they could beat the Scottish Duke, and any other Scotsman he could find to play alongside him. It was agreed that a game would be played at Leith Links, just outside Edinburgh city centre. The Leith Links would have been one of the most important golf clubs of the era, with the rules of golf being developed there and adopted by the Royal and Ancient Company of Golfers on their move to St. Andrews in 1777, and as the home course of the Gentlemen Golfers of Edinburgh who would later become The Honourable Company of Edinburgh Golfers. The prize was to be national claim to the game of golf, and an undisclosed sum of money.

The Duke called for John Paterson, a cobbler and amateur golfer to be his team mate. Paterson had a reputation as being one of the finest golfers in the country, taking after his father and grandfather.

Paterson and the Duke were successful, and won the match. As the Duke had an attendant to carry his clubs, some have cited this as the first recorded use of a caddie in golf.

The House

The Duke is said to have given the winnings to Paterson, who used the funds to buy the property at 79 - 81 Canongate on the Royal Mile, and to build a large mansion on it, that he could be close to Holyrood Palace should he ever be called upon for his golfing service again. He named this site "Golfers Land". The property is recorded as having been five stories high, and was built over the entrance to Brown's Close.

The Duke is also said to have awarded Paterson a coat of arms, a plaque of which was placed on the wall, and which remains on the site to this day. The arms were a shield of three pelicans in piety, on a chief three mullets. This shield is surmounted by a helm and mantling and a crest of a hand grasping a golf-club.

Despite being Category A listed the building was demolished in 1960.

The site today
The site is currently occupied by a building built in the 1960s. The present occupants are the Kilderkin Pub. A plaque remains on the wall to mark the site, and to commemorate the golf game.

References

Areas of Edinburgh
Royal Mile
Demolished buildings and structures in Scotland
History of golf
17th century in Scotland
Golf in Edinburgh